The Samuel P. Dixon Farm is a historic farm near Ashland, New Castle County, Delaware. The property includes three contributing stone buildings: a house, a spring house and a tri-level bank barn.  The house is a two-story, four-bay dwelling in two sections.  The older section is dated to the late 18th or early 19th century, with an addition before 1830, about the time the barn was built.

In the 20th Century, it became part of Ashland Farm, a Du Pont estate. It was added to the National Register of Historic Places in 1986.

References

Farms on the National Register of Historic Places in Delaware
Houses completed in 1812
Houses in New Castle County, Delaware
National Register of Historic Places in New Castle County, Delaware
Stone houses in the United States